John Lee Smith (May 16, 1894 – September 26, 1963) was the 32nd Lieutenant Governor of Texas serving under Governor Coke R. Stevenson during World War II and a vocal opponent of Texas labor unions during his tenure.

Born May 16, 1894 at Chico, Texas, and raised in Throckmorton, Texas, Smith was educated at Stamford College and West Texas State Teachers College before teaching school. In 1918, he went to France as a member of American Expeditionary Forces; while overseas, he also studied at a French university. Upon his return, he studied law at Chautauqua, New York, and went back to Throckmorton to practice law.

In 1920, Smith was elected Throckmorton County Judge and was the youngest judge in Texas at the time. He served until 1926, and then spent five years as a lawyer with the state education department in Austin. Smith returned to the private practice of law in 1931.

Smith was elected to the Texas Senate in 1940, and ran for and won the lieutenant governorship in 1942. He was reelected in 1944. While in the Legislature, both as member and presiding officer of the Senate, Smith was a critic of the closed shop;  he supported legislation that would prohibit a person from interfering with another person's right to engage in a lawful occupation. He also supported a provision that would make it a felony for any union laborer to commit an act of violence while on strike and the Manford Act of 1943, a union regulation bill.

In 1946, Smith sought the Democratic nomination for governor, but he finished fifth behind Beauford Jester, Homer Rainey, Grover Sellers, and Jerry Sadler. Returning to the private practice of law, he formed a partnership with his son in Lubbock, where he died on September 26, 1963.

References
Tex. Legis. Council, Presiding Officers of the Texas Legislature: 1846-1995 79 (1995).

External links
 

1894 births
1963 deaths
Lieutenant Governors of Texas
Democratic Party Texas state senators
People from Wise County, Texas
Texas lawyers
20th-century American politicians
People from Throckmorton, Texas
People from Lubbock, Texas
20th-century American lawyers